Metacolpodes is a genus of ground beetles in the family Carabidae. There are at least 30 described species in Metacolpodes.

Species
These 30 species belong to the genus Metacolpodes:

 Metacolpodes amoenulus (Jedlicka, 1934)  (Japan)
 Metacolpodes buchanani (Hope, 1831)
 Metacolpodes buchannani (Hope, 1831)  (worldwide)
 Metacolpodes buxtoni (Andrewes, 1927)  (Samoa)
 Metacolpodes cyaneus (Perroud, 1864)  (New Caledonia)
 Metacolpodes deliasianum Morvan, 1999  (Myanmar)
 Metacolpodes fryi (Bates, 1889)  (Borneo and Indonesia)
 Metacolpodes godavaricus (Kirschenhofer, 1992)  (Nepal)
 Metacolpodes grandis (Landin, 1955)  (Myanmar)
 Metacolpodes hardwickii (Hope, 1831)  (India and Nepal)
 Metacolpodes hopkinsi (Andrewes, 1927)  (Samoa)
 Metacolpodes janakpurensis (Kirschenhofer, 1992)  (Nepal)
 Metacolpodes janelloides (Louwerens, 1953)  (India)
 Metacolpodes janellus (Bates, 1892)  (Myanmar)
 Metacolpodes laetus (Erichson, 1834)  (worldwide)
 Metacolpodes landrungensis (Kirschenhofer, 1992)  (Nepal)
 Metacolpodes laticeps (Emden, 1936)  (Indonesia)
 Metacolpodes limodromoides (Bates, 1883)  (Japan)
 Metacolpodes monticola (Fairmaire, 1849)  (Tahiti)
 Metacolpodes nilgherriensis (Chaudoir, 1878)  (India)
 Metacolpodes olivius (Bates, 1873)  (worldwide)
 Metacolpodes parallelus (Chaudoir, 1859)  (Indonesia and Malaysia)
 Metacolpodes planithorax (Louwerens, 1953)  (India)
 Metacolpodes rambouseki (Jedlicka, 1934)  (China)
 Metacolpodes rotundatus (Chaudoir, 1878)  (India and Myanmar)
 Metacolpodes rotundicollis (Landin, 1955)  (Myanmar)
 Metacolpodes superlita (Bates, 1888)  (China)
 Metacolpodes takakuwai Morita, 2015  (Japan)
 Metacolpodes tetraglochis (Andrewes, 1929)  (Indonesia, Malaysia, and Nepal)
 Metacolpodes truncatellus (Fairmaire, 1881)  (worldwide)

References

Platyninae